Zienteck is an adventure for fantasy role-playing games published by Judges Guild in 1981.

Plot summary
Zienteck is a scenario for character levels 5-9 set in a large dungeon complex.  The book includes detailed wandering monster tables and several local wilderness encounters.

Beyond the ill-famed Black Angel Woods, legend has it lie the remains of Wizard Zienteck's stronghold – where wizardly books and treasure survived the destruction of Griendal the Dragon.  This booklet provides encounter tables for the Black Angel Woods and Dragon Mountains, two new monsters (black angels and fire chameleons), a wilderness map, a Dragon's Lair map, and the info on Zienteck dungeon (including an optional players' map).

Publication history
Zienteck was written by Mark Harmon, and was published by Judges Guild in 1981 as a 32-page book.

TSR opted not to renew Judges Guild's license for D&D when it expired in September 1980. They managed to hold onto their AD&D license a little while longer, so adventures like The Illhiedrin Book (1981), Zienteck (1981), Trial by Fire (1981), and Rudy Kraft's Portals of Twilight (1981) would finish off that line.

Reception
W. G. Armintrout reviewed the adventure in The Space Gamer No. 55. He commented that "There are a few bright spots – a monster custom-designed by old Zienteck himself, and murals in the dungeon that clue the adventurers in as to what originally went on there.  A DM will have few problems running this adventure." He called it "Just a hack-and-slash adventure.  All clues are worthless, the wilderness map is 80% unexplained [...] and the narrator's idea of wit makes my gorge rise.  The only NPCs are the dragons themselves." Armintrout concluded the review by saying, "What a bore!  An intrepid 12-year-old could do just as well, and perhaps better.  Don't buy Zienteck."

Reviews
 Different Worlds #17 (Dec 1981)

References

Judges Guild fantasy role-playing game adventures
Role-playing game supplements introduced in 1981